Nibiru World Tour is the third world tour by Puerto Rican reggaeton star Ozuna to promote his third studio album Nibiru. The tour kick of in Santo Domingo, Dominican Republic on 14 February 2020. The tour was expected to have four legs, visiting Latin America, Europe and an 19-date arena tour in the United States ending on September 4, 2020 at Madison Square Garden in New York. However, the tour was cancelled due the Covid-19 global pandemic.

Tour Dates

Cancelled Concerts

Notes

References 

Ozuna (singer)
2020 concert tours
Concert tours of South America
Concert tours cancelled due to the COVID-19 pandemic